Noronshasht (Arabic: IPA ['ka.biːr])) was the large trade hub on the Silk Road and capital city of Moxel in 1230-1237. It was the administrative center of Murunza and one of the centres of coinage. In 1237 century the city was taken over by Batu Khan and became the capital of the Golden Horde. The ruins (buildings of stone, fortifications, Pagan cemetery) are in Penza Oblast near the modern town of Narovchat in the confluence of Sheldais and Moksha River.

Foundation and etymology
The city foundation date is unknown. The archeological findings confirmed the first city population was Moksha. According to Iosif Cherapkin the ancient name of the city was Noronshasht in Middle Moksha means 'former bog place covered with grass'. The city lay in a lowland on a former bog place. First mention of the city is al-Idrisi's map under the name Kabir (Great) in early version of 1154. After 13th c he city was often referred to as Mukhsha or Mukhshi which in fact was the name of the ulus Mukhsha of the Golden Horde (after the name of Mokshaland), the official city name used in the Mongol period was Nurinjat .

History 
Noronshasht was the capital of Medieval Moksha kingdom Murunza. Russian Laurentian Codex mentions the name of its king Puresh. Noronshasht was conquered by Batu Khan in 1237.
In ancient period attested private and public baths, running water, sewerage, underfloor heating. The streets were paved with stones, there were fountains with drinking water, inns, royal palace, houses of stone. There were potteries with ancient forges. There was an artisan quarter with numerous workshops. Residential quarters partly lay nowadays under the rural locality Narovchat. Northwest of Narovchat lays the gravefield (Pagan cemetery)

Coinage 

Yarmaq still means money in contemporary Moksha language and shelegs might be minted in Noronshasht as well.

 Other coins names were valf, oka (gold), variaftom (variavne , and sere/serene.

Architecture

Moksha lions 
Ethnologists and historians state that there is a connection between Mokshaland animal style archeological findings and early Russian reliefs especially so called "smiling lions" in inner decor of Cathedral of Saint Demetrius in Vladimir. They believe similar "Mokshan lions" might have preserved in Ancient Noronshasht and Sernya stone buildings if the cities had not been destroyed in Middle ages. The animal style dates back to Scythian art and prominent for Saltovo-Mayaki culture. Schapov explains this by the fact that brother of Andrew the Pious Vsevolod the Big Nest had married to  princess Maria (Shvarnovna). Artisans who performed this unique for Russia style came together with her and they were Alans who share Animal style with Mokshas Larionov also mentions animal style in Church of the Intercession on the Nerl of Andrew the Pious and Cathedral of the Nativity in Suzdal.

Discovery and Excavations 
The Medieval city ruins were discovered by Russian archeologist Aleksandr Krotkov in 1915.

Museum-reserve

See also 
Moxel
Alania
Khazar Khaganate
Gardariki
Bjarmaland
sheleg
Oka
Variaftom
Variavne
Sere (coin)

References

Notes

Footnotes

Sources

See also
Mokshas
Moxel
Mokshaland History
Burtas
Khazar Khaganate

Volga Finns
Khazars
Moksha people
Medieval Russia
Defunct towns in Russia
Geography of Penza Oblast
Former populated places in Russia